Modern art includes artistic work produced during the period extending roughly from the 1860s to the 1970s, and denotes the styles and philosophies of the art produced during that era. The term is usually associated with art in which the traditions of the past have been thrown aside in a spirit of experimentation. Modern artists experimented with new ways of seeing and with fresh ideas about the nature of materials and functions of art. A tendency away from the narrative, which was characteristic for the traditional arts, toward abstraction is characteristic of much modern art. More recent artistic production is often called contemporary art or postmodern art.

Modern art begins with the heritage of painters like Vincent van Gogh, Paul Cézanne, Paul Gauguin, Georges Seurat and Henri de Toulouse-Lautrec all of whom were essential for the development of modern art. At the beginning of the 20th century Henri Matisse and several other young artists including the pre-cubists Georges Braque, André Derain, Raoul Dufy, Jean Metzinger and Maurice de Vlaminck revolutionized the Paris art world with "wild", multi-colored, expressive landscapes and figure paintings that the critics called Fauvism. Matisse's two versions of The Dance signified a key point in his career and in the development of modern painting. It reflected Matisse's incipient fascination with primitive art: the intense warm color of the figures against the cool blue-green background and the rhythmical succession of the dancing nudes convey the feelings of emotional liberation and hedonism.

At the start of 20th-century Western painting, and initially influenced by Toulouse-Lautrec, Gauguin and other late-19th-century innovators, Pablo Picasso made his first Cubist paintings based on Cézanne's idea that all depiction of nature can be reduced to three solids: cube, sphere and cone. With the painting Les Demoiselles d'Avignon (1907), Picasso dramatically created a new and radical picture depicting a raw and primitive brothel scene with five prostitutes, violently painted women, reminiscent of African tribal masks and his own new Cubist inventions. Analytic cubism was jointly developed by Picasso and Georges Braque, exemplified by Violin and Candlestick, Paris, from about 1908 through 1912. Analytic cubism, the first clear manifestation of cubism, was followed by Synthetic cubism, practiced by Braque, Picasso, Fernand Léger, Juan Gris, Albert Gleizes, Marcel Duchamp and several other artists into the 1920s. Synthetic cubism is characterized by the introduction of different textures, surfaces, collage elements, papier collé and a large variety of merged subject matter.

The notion of modern art is closely related to modernism.

History

Roots in the 19th century 

Although modern sculpture and architecture are reckoned to have emerged at the end of the 19th century, the beginnings of modern painting can be located earlier. The date perhaps most commonly identified as marking the birth of modern art is 1863, the year that Édouard Manet showed his painting Le déjeuner sur l'herbe in the Salon des Refusés in Paris. Earlier dates have also been proposed, among them 1855 (the year Gustave Courbet exhibited The Artist's Studio) and 1784 (the year Jacques-Louis David completed his painting The Oath of the Horatii). In the words of art historian H. Harvard Arnason: "Each of these dates has significance for the development of modern art, but none categorically marks a completely new beginning ....  A gradual metamorphosis took place in the course of a hundred years."

The strands of thought that eventually led to modern art can be traced back to the Enlightenment. The important modern art critic Clement Greenberg, for instance, called Immanuel Kant "the first real Modernist" but also drew a distinction: "The Enlightenment criticized from the outside ... . Modernism criticizes from the inside." The French Revolution of 1789 uprooted assumptions and institutions that had for centuries been accepted with little question and accustomed the public to vigorous political and social debate. This gave rise to what art historian Ernst Gombrich called a "self-consciousness that made people select the style of their building as one selects the pattern of a wallpaper."

The pioneers of modern art were Romantics, Realists and Impressionists. By the late 19th century, additional movements which were to be influential in modern art had begun to emerge: post-Impressionism and Symbolism.

Influences upon these movements were varied: from exposure to Eastern decorative arts, particularly Japanese printmaking, to the coloristic innovations of Turner and Delacroix, to a search for more realism in the depiction of common life, as found in the work of painters such as Jean-François Millet. The advocates of realism stood against the idealism of the tradition-bound academic art that enjoyed public and official favor. The most successful painters of the day worked either through commissions or through large public exhibitions of their own work. There were official, government-sponsored painters' unions, while governments regularly held public exhibitions of new fine and decorative arts.

The Impressionists argued that people do not see objects but only the light which they reflect, and therefore painters should paint in natural light (en plein air) rather than in studios and should capture the effects of light in their work. Impressionist artists formed a group, Société Anonyme Coopérative des Artistes Peintres, Sculpteurs, Graveurs ("Association of Painters, Sculptors, and Engravers") which, despite internal tensions, mounted a series of independent exhibitions. The style was adopted by artists in different nations, in preference to a "national" style. These factors established the view that it was a "movement". These traits—establishment of a working method integral to the art, establishment of a movement or visible active core of support, and international adoption—would be repeated by artistic movements in the Modern period in art.

Early 20th century 

Among the movements which flowered in the first decade of the 20th century were Fauvism, Cubism, Expressionism, and Futurism.

During the years between 1910 and the end of World War I and after the heyday of cubism, several movements emerged in Paris. Giorgio de Chirico moved to Paris in July 1911, where he joined his brother Andrea (the poet and painter known as Alberto Savinio). Through his brother he met Pierre Laprade, a member of the jury at the Salon d'Automne where he exhibited three of his dreamlike works: Enigma of the Oracle, Enigma of an Afternoon and Self-Portrait. During 1913 he exhibited his work at the Salon des Indépendants and Salon d’Automne, and his work was noticed by Pablo Picasso, Guillaume Apollinaire, and several others. His compelling and mysterious paintings are considered instrumental to the early beginnings of Surrealism. Song of Love (1914) is one of the most famous works by de Chirico and is an early example of the surrealist style, though it was painted ten years before the movement was "founded" by André Breton in 1924.

World War I brought an end to this phase but indicated the beginning of a number of anti-art movements, such as Dada, including the work of Marcel Duchamp, and of Surrealism. Artist groups like de Stijl and Bauhaus developed new ideas about the interrelation of the arts, architecture, design, and art education.

Modern art was introduced to the United States with the Armory Show in 1913 and through European artists who moved to the U.S. during World War I.

After World War II 
It was only after World War II, however, that the U.S. became the focal point of new artistic movements. The 1950s and 1960s saw the emergence of Abstract Expressionism, Color field painting, Conceptual artists of Art & Language, Pop art, Op art, Hard-edge painting, Minimal art, Lyrical Abstraction, Fluxus, Happening, Video art, Postminimalism, Photorealism and various other movements. In the late 1960s and the 1970s, Land art, Performance art, Conceptual art, and other new art forms had attracted the attention of curators and critics, at the expense of more traditional media. Larger installations and performances became widespread.

By the end of the 1970s, when cultural critics began speaking of "the end of painting" (the title of a provocative essay written in 1981 by Douglas Crimp), new media art had become a category in itself, with a growing number of artists experimenting with technological means such as video art. Painting assumed renewed importance in the 1980s and 1990s, as evidenced by the rise of neo-expressionism and the revival of figurative painting.

Towards the end of the 20th century, a number of artists and architects started questioning the idea of "the modern" and created typically Postmodern works.

Art movements and artist groups 
(Roughly chronological with representative artists listed.)

19th century 
 Romanticism and the Romantic movement – Francisco de Goya, J. M. W. Turner, Eugène Delacroix
 Realism – Gustave Courbet, Camille Corot, Jean-François Millet, Rosa Bonheur
 Pre-Raphaelites – William Holman Hunt, John Everett Millais, Dante Gabriel Rossetti
 Macchiaioli – Giovanni Fattori, Silvestro Lega, Telemaco Signorini
 Impressionism – Frédéric Bazille, Gustave Caillebotte, Mary Cassatt, Edgar Degas, Armand Guillaumin, Édouard Manet, Claude Monet, Berthe Morisot, Pierre-Auguste Renoir, Camille Pissarro, Alfred Sisley
 Post-impressionism – Georges Seurat, Paul Cézanne, Paul Gauguin, Vincent van Gogh, Henri de Toulouse-Lautrec, Henri Rousseau, Henri-Jean Guillaume Martin, Albert Lebourg, Robert Antoine Pinchon
 Pointillism – Georges Seurat, Paul Signac, Maximilien Luce, Henri-Edmond Cross
 Divisionism – Gaetano Previati, Giovanni Segantini, Pellizza da Volpedo
 Symbolism – Gustave Moreau, Odilon Redon, Edvard Munch, James Whistler, James Ensor
 Les Nabis – Pierre Bonnard, Édouard Vuillard, Félix Vallotton, Maurice Denis, Paul Sérusier
 Art Nouveau and variants – Jugendstil, Secession, Modern Style, Modernisme – Aubrey Beardsley, Alphonse Mucha, Gustav Klimt,
 Art Nouveau architecture and design – Antoni Gaudí, Otto Wagner, Wiener Werkstätte, Josef Hoffmann, Adolf Loos, Koloman Moser
 Early Modernist sculptors – Aristide Maillol, Auguste Rodin

Early 20th century (before World War I) 
 Abstract art – Francis Picabia, Wassily Kandinsky, František Kupka, Robert Delaunay, Sonia Delaunay, Léopold Survage, Piet Mondrian, Kazimir Malevich, Hilma af Klint
 Fauvism – André Derain, Henri Matisse, Maurice de Vlaminck, Georges Braque, Kees van Dongen
 Expressionism and related – Die Brücke, Der Blaue Reiter – Ernst Ludwig Kirchner, Wassily Kandinsky, Franz Marc, Egon Schiele, Oskar Kokoschka, Emil Nolde, Axel Törneman, Karl Schmidt-Rottluff, Max Pechstein
 Cubism – Pablo Picasso, Georges Braque, Jean Metzinger, Albert Gleizes, Fernand Léger, Robert Delaunay, Henri Le Fauconnier, Marcel Duchamp, Jacques Villon, Francis Picabia, Juan Gris
 Futurism – Giacomo Balla, Umberto Boccioni, Carlo Carrà, Gino Severini, Natalia Goncharova, Mikhail Larionov
 Orphism – Robert Delaunay, Sonia Delaunay, František Kupka
 Suprematism – Kazimir Malevich, Alexander Rodchenko, El Lissitzky
 Synchromism – Stanton Macdonald-Wright, Morgan Russell
 Vorticism – Wyndham Lewis
 Sculpture – Constantin Brâncuși, Joseph Csaky, Alexander Archipenko, Raymond Duchamp-Villon, Jacques Lipchitz, Ossip Zadkine, Henri Laurens, Elie Nadelman, Chaim Gross, Chana Orloff, Jacob Epstein, Gustave Miklos
 Photography – Pictorialism, Straight photography

World War I to World War II 
 Dada – Jean Arp, Marcel Duchamp, Max Ernst, Francis Picabia, Kurt Schwitters
 Surrealism – Marc Chagall, René Magritte, Jean Arp, Salvador Dalí, Max Ernst, Giorgio de Chirico, André Masson, Joan Miró
Expressionism and related:  Chaim Soutine, Abraham Mintchine
 Pittura Metafisica – Giorgio de Chirico, Carlo Carrà, Giorgio Morandi
 De Stijl – Theo van Doesburg, Piet Mondrian
 New Objectivity – Max Beckmann, Otto Dix, George Grosz
 Figurative painting – Henri Matisse, Pierre Bonnard
 American Modernism – Stuart Davis, Arthur G. Dove, Marsden Hartley, Georgia O'Keeffe
 Constructivism – Naum Gabo, Gustav Klutsis, László Moholy-Nagy, El Lissitzky, Kasimir Malevich, Vadim Meller, Alexander Rodchenko, Vladimir Tatlin
 Bauhaus – Wassily Kandinsky, Paul Klee, Josef Albers
 Scottish Colourists – Francis Cadell, Samuel Peploe, Leslie Hunter, John Duncan Fergusson
 Social realism – Grant Wood, Walker Evans, Diego Rivera
 Precisionism – Charles Sheeler, Charles Demuth
 Boychukism - Mykhailo Boychuk, Sofiya Nalepinska-Boychuk, Ivan Padalka, Vasily Sedlyar
 Sculpture – Alexander Calder, Alberto Giacometti, Gaston Lachaise, Henry Moore, Pablo Picasso, Julio Gonzalez

After World War II 
 Figuratifs – Bernard Buffet, Jean Carzou, Maurice Boitel, Daniel du Janerand, Claude-Max Lochu
 Sculpture – Henry Moore, David Smith, Tony Smith, Alexander Calder, Isamu Noguchi, Alberto Giacometti, Sir Anthony Caro, Jean Dubuffet, Isaac Witkin, René Iché, Marino Marini, Louise Nevelson, Albert Vrana
 Abstract expressionism – Joan Mitchell, Willem de Kooning, Jackson Pollock, Arshile Gorky, Hans Hofmann, Franz Kline, Robert Motherwell, Clyfford Still, Lee Krasner,
 American Abstract Artists – Ilya Bolotowsky, Ibram Lassaw, Ad Reinhardt, Josef Albers, Burgoyne Diller
 Art Brut – Adolf Wölfli, August Natterer, Ferdinand Cheval, Madge Gill
 Arte Povera – Jannis Kounellis, Luciano Fabro, Mario Merz, Piero Manzoni, Alighiero Boetti
 Color field painting – Barnett Newman, Mark Rothko, Adolph Gottlieb, Sam Francis, Morris Louis, Kenneth Noland, Jules Olitski, Helen Frankenthaler
 Tachisme – Jean Dubuffet, Pierre Soulages, Hans Hartung, Ludwig Merwart
 COBRA – Pierre Alechinsky, Karel Appel, Asger Jorn
 Conceptual art – Art & Language, Dan Graham, Lawrence Weiner, Bruce Nauman, Daniel Buren, Victor Burgin, Sol LeWitt
 De-collage – Wolf Vostell, Mimmo Rotella
 Neo-Dada – Robert Rauschenberg, Jasper Johns, John Chamberlain, Joseph Beuys, Lee Bontecou, Edward Kienholz
 Figurative Expressionism – Larry Rivers, Grace Hartigan, Elaine de Kooning, Robert De Niro, Sr., Lester Johnson, George McNeil, Earle M. Pilgrim, Jan Müller, Robert Beauchamp, Bob Thompson
Feminist Art — Eva Hesse, Judy Chicago, Barbara Kruger, Mary Beth Edelson, Ewa Partum, Valie Export, Yoko Ono, Louise Bourgeois, Cindy Sherman, Kiki Smith, Guerrilla Girls, Hannah Wilke
 Fluxus – George Maciunas, Joseph Beuys, Wolf Vostell, Nam June Paik, Daniel Spoerri, Dieter Roth, Carolee Schneeman, Alison Knowles, Charlotte Moorman, Dick Higgins
 Happening – Allan Kaprow, Joseph Beuys, Wolf Vostell, Claes Oldenburg, Jim Dine, Red Grooms, Nam June Paik, Charlotte Moorman, Robert Whitman, Yoko Ono
 Dau-al-Set – founded in Barcelona by poet/artist Joan Brossa, – Antoni Tàpies
  – founded in Madrid by artists Antonio Saura, Pablo Serrano
 Geometric abstraction – Wassily Kandinsky, Kazimir Malevich, Nadir Afonso, Manlio Rho, Mario Radice, Mino Argento, Adam Szentpétery
 Hard-edge painting – John McLaughlin, Ellsworth Kelly, Frank Stella, Al Held, Ronald Davis
 Kinetic art – George Rickey, Getulio Alviani
 Land art – Ana Mendieta, Christo, Richard Long, Robert Smithson, Michael Heizer
 Les Automatistes – Claude Gauvreau, Jean-Paul Riopelle, Pierre Gauvreau, Fernand Leduc, Jean-Paul Mousseau, Marcelle Ferron
 Minimal art – Sol LeWitt, Donald Judd, Dan Flavin, Richard Serra, Agnes Martin
 Postminimalism – Eva Hesse, Bruce Nauman, Lynda Benglis
 Lyrical abstraction – Ronnie Landfield, Sam Gilliam, Larry Zox, Dan Christensen, Natvar Bhavsar, Larry Poons
 Neo-figurative art – Fernando Botero, Antonio Berni
 Neo-expressionism – Georg Baselitz, Anselm Kiefer, Jörg Immendorff, Jean-Michel Basquiat
 Transavanguardia – Francesco Clemente, Mimmo Paladino, Sandro Chia, Enzo Cucchi
 Figuration libre – Hervé Di Rosa, François Boisrond, Robert Combas
 New realism – Yves Klein, Pierre Restany, Arman
 Op art – Victor Vasarely, Bridget Riley, Richard Anuszkiewicz, Jeffrey Steele
 Outsider art – Howard Finster, Grandma Moses, Bob Justin
 Photorealism – Audrey Flack, Chuck Close, Duane Hanson, Richard Estes, Malcolm Morley
 Pop art – Richard Hamilton, Robert Indiana, Jasper Johns, Roy Lichtenstein, Robert Rauschenberg, Andy Warhol, Ed Ruscha, David Hockney
 Postwar European figurative painting – Lucian Freud, Francis Bacon, Frank Auerbach, Gerhard Richter
 New European Painting – Luc Tuymans, Marlene Dumas, Neo Rauch, Bracha Ettinger, Michaël Borremans, Chris Ofili
 Shaped canvas – Frank Stella, Kenneth Noland, Ron Davis, Robert Mangold.
 Soviet art – Aleksandr Deyneka, Aleksandr Gerasimov, Ilya Kabakov, Komar & Melamid, Alexandr Zhdanov, Leonid Sokov
 Spatialism – Lucio Fontana
 Video art – Nam June Paik, Wolf Vostell, Joseph Beuys, Bill Viola, Hans Breder
 Visionary art – Ernst Fuchs, Paul Laffoley, Michael Bowen

Notable modern art exhibitions and museums

Austria 
 Leopold Museum, Vienna

Belgium 
 SMAK, Ghent

Brazil 
 MASP, São Paulo, SP
 MAM/SP, São Paulo, SP
 MAM/RJ, Rio de Janeiro, RJ
 MAM/BA, Salvador, Bahia

Colombia 
 Bogotá Museum of Modern Art (MAMBO)

Croatia 
 Ivan Meštrović Gallery, Split
 Modern Gallery, Zagreb
 Museum of Contemporary Art, Zagreb

Ecuador 
 Museo Antropologico y de Arte Contemporaneo, Guayaquil
 La Capilla del Hombre, Quito

Finland 
 EMMA, Espoo
 Kiasma, Helsinki

France 
 Château de Montsoreau-Museum of Contemporary Art, Montsoreau
 Lille Métropole Museum of Modern, Contemporary and Outsider Art, Villeneuve d'Ascq
 Musée d'Orsay, Paris
 Musée d'Art Moderne de la Ville de Paris, Paris
 Musée National d'Art Moderne, Paris
 Musée Picasso, Paris
 Museum of Modern and Contemporary Art, Strasbourg
 Musée d'art moderne de Troyes

Germany 
 documenta, Kassel, an exhibition of modern and contemporary art held every 5 years
 Museum Ludwig, Cologne
 Pinakothek der Moderne, Munich

India 
 National Gallery of Modern Art, New Delhi
 National Gallery of Modern Art, Mumbai
 National Gallery of Modern Art, Bangalore

Iran 
 Museum of Contemporary Art, Tehran

Ireland 
 Hugh Lane Gallery, Dublin
 Irish Museum of Modern Art, Dublin

Israel
 Tel Aviv Museum of Art

Italy 
 Palazzo delle Esposizioni
 Galleria Nazionale d'Arte Moderna
 Venice Biennial, Venice
 Palazzo Pitti, Florence
 Museo del Novecento, Milan

Mexico 
 Museo de Arte Moderno, México D.F.

Netherlands 
 Van Gogh Museum, Amsterdam
 Stedelijk Museum, Amsterdam

Norway 
 Astrup Fearnley Museum of Modern Art, Oslo
 Henie-Onstad Art Centre, Oslo

Poland 
 Museum of Art, Łódź
 National Museum, Kraków

Qatar 
 Mathaf: Arab Museum of Modern Art, Doha

Romania 
 National Museum of Contemporary Art, Bucharest

Russia 
 Hermitage Museum, Saint Petersburg
 Pushkin Museum, Moscow
 Tretyakov Gallery, Moscow

Serbia 
 Museum of Contemporary Art, Belgrade

Spain 
 Museu d'Art Contemporani de Barcelona, Barcelona
 Museo Nacional Centro de Arte Reina Sofía, Madrid
 Thyssen-Bornemisza Museum, Madrid
 Institut Valencià d'Art Modern, Valencia
 Atlantic Center of Modern Art, Las Palmas de Gran Canaria
 Museu Picasso, Barcelona.
 Museo Picasso Málaga, Málaga.

Sweden 
 Moderna Museet, Stockholm

Taiwan
 Asia Museum of Modern Art, Taichung

United Kingdom
 Estorick Collection of Modern Italian Art, London
 Saatchi Gallery, London
 Tate Britain, London
 Tate Liverpool
 Tate Modern, London
 Tate St Ives

Ukraine 
 National Art Museum of Ukraine, Kyiv
 Andrey Sheptytsky National Museum of Lviv, Lviv

United States 
 Albright-Knox Art Gallery, Buffalo, New York
 Art Institute of Chicago, Chicago, Illinois
 Governor Nelson A. Rockefeller Empire State Plaza Art Collection, Albany, New York
 Guggenheim Museum, New York City, New York, and Venice, Italy ; more recently in Berlin, Germany, Bilbao, Spain, and Las Vegas, Nevada
 High Museum, Atlanta, Georgia
 Los Angeles County Museum of Art, Los Angeles, California
 McNay Art Museum, San Antonio, Texas
 Menil Collection, Houston, Texas
 Museum of Fine Arts, Boston, Massachusetts
 Museum of Modern Art, New York City, New York
 San Francisco Museum of Modern Art, San Francisco, California
 The Baker Museum, Naples, Florida
 Walker Art Center, Minneapolis, Minnesota
 Whitney Museum of American Art, New York City, New York

See also 

 20th-century art
 Art manifesto
 Gesamtkunstwerk
 History of painting
 List of 20th-century women artists
 List of modern artists
 Modern architecture
 Periods in Western art history
 Western painting

Notes

References

Sources

Further reading 

 

 

 

 

 See also: The First Moderns.

External links 

 Tate Modern
 The Museum of Modern Art
 Modern artists and art
 A TIME Archives Collection of Modern Art's perception
 National Gallery of Modern Art – Govt. of India